Easington Lane is a village in the City of Sunderland metropolitan borough in the county of Tyne and Wear, North East England. Historically part of County Durham and located between Hetton-le-Hole, Seaham, Peterlee and Durham. It had a population of 4,044 at the 2001 Census, increasing to 7,193 at the 2011 Census.

Amenities

The village contains a small shopping center on the A182 road between Peterlee and Washington and also is home to the parish church of the village, St Michael and All Angels.

Transport
The village is served by buses operated by Go North East who provided services to Newcastle-upon-Tyne, Sunderland, Peterlee, Washington, Houghton-le-Spring and Hetton-le-Hole The village is also close to the A1(M). The village was served by two railway lines (both of which are now closed). It was served by the Leamside Line and Durham and Sunderland Railway. There were stations at Hetton and Souh Hetton. The nearest active stations to the village are in Chester-le-Street, Sunderland, Horden and Durham.

References 

 City of Sunderland suburbs